The qualification event of the 2016 World Wheelchair Curling Championship, known as the 2015 World Wheelchair Curling B-Championship, was held from November 7 to 12, 2015 at the Kisakallio Sports Institute in Lohja, Finland. The qualification event was open to any World Curling Federation member nation not already qualified for the World Championship. The event's two top finishers will join the top seven finishers from the last World Wheelchair Curling Championship at this season's event in Lucerne, Switzerland.

This event marked the first appearance of the nations of Estonia, Israel, and Lithuania at an international wheelchair curling event.

Teams

Round-robin standings
Final round-robin standings

Round-robin results
All draw times are listed in Eastern European Time (UTC+02).

Draw 1
Saturday, November 7, 16:30

Draw 2
Saturday, November 7, 20:00

Draw 3
Sunday, November 8, 8:30

Draw 4
Sunday, November 8, 12:00

Draw 5
Sunday, November 8, 15:30

Draw 6
Sunday, November 8, 19:00

Draw 7
Monday, November 9, 9:00

Draw 8
Monday, November 9, 13:00

Draw 9
Monday, November 9, 17:00

Draw 10
Tuesday, November 10, 8:30

Draw 11
Tuesday, November 10, 12:00

Draw 12
Tuesday, November 10, 15:30

Draw 13
Tuesday, November 10, 19:00

Draw 14
Wednesday, November 11, 9:00

Playoffs

Quarterfinals
Wednesday, November 11, 18:00

Semifinals
Thursday, November 12, 9:00

Bronze medal game
Thursday, November 12, 14:30

Gold medal game
Thursday, November 12, 14:30

References

External links

World Wheelchair Curling Championship
2015 in curling
2015 in Finnish sport
International curling competitions hosted by Finland
Lohja